The Waldheim station is a former railway station in Waldheim, Saskatchewan. It was built by the Canadian Northern Railway. The -storey, stucco-clad, wood-frame building was built as a third class station, with the waiting, ticketing and cargo area on the main floor and the private living area for the station agent split between the main and second floor.  The building served as a railway station from 1912 until 1976; it is now used as a library and museum. The building was designated a Municipal Heritage Property in 1983.

References 

Canadian National Railway stations in Saskatchewan
Canadian Northern Railway stations in Saskatchewan
Railway stations closed in 1976
Railway stations in Canada opened in 1912
Disused railway stations in Canada
1912 establishments in Saskatchewan
Laird No. 404, Saskatchewan